I Enjoy the World with You is a 1982 Czechoslovak family comedy directed by Marie Poledňáková. The movie was elected as the best Czech comedy ever made.

Plot
Every year, three middle-aged friends, sound engineer Pepa, doctor Albert, and music director Michal, plan to spend their vacation at Albert's cottage in the Beskids. They always go there without their wives but this year, the wives decide to make them change their minds. They promise to let their husbands go without them under one condition - they will take all their children instead. The wives are sure their husbands will never accept, but the men decide to take the kids and do their best to exhaust them during the day so that they have some time for themselves in the evening. Nothing goes according to plan, however.

The cottage, set in a picturesque mountain environment without electricity, with outdoor latrines for toilets and the need to chop wood for cooking, presents unique challenges to the children as well as many opportunities for humorous situations. The fathers come up with various dangerous games and contests in order to keep their kids occupied.
The three wives surprise their husbands by visiting unexpectedly, and they are not pleased with the scene which greets them. They then proceed to get back at their husbands for their irresponsible behaviour.

Cast and characters
 Július Satinský as Albert Horák
 Jana Šulcová as Kateřina Horáková
 Václav Postránecký as Michal Adámek
 Eliška Balzerová as Dáša Adámková
 Pavel Nový as Pepa Bednář
 Zdena Studenková as Gábina Bednářová
 Květa Fialová as grandmother
 Jan Faltýnek as taxi driver
 Zuzana Gutheisová a Dášenka
 Marta Buchtíková as Kačenka
 Václav Korda as Míša
 Cyril Křupala as Pepíno
 Lukáš Pelánek as Matýsek
 Marek Dvořák as Bertík

References

External links
 

1982 comedy films
1982 films
1980s Czech-language films
Czechoslovak comedy films
Films directed by Marie Poledňáková
Czech comedy films
1980s Czech films